The 1977–78 Maltese First Division was the 63rd season of top-tier football in Malta.  It was contested by 10 teams, and Valletta F.C. won the championship.

League standings

Results

References
 Malta - List of final tables (RSSSF)

Maltese Premier League seasons
Malta
1